Quettreville-sur-Sienne is a commune in the Manche department in north-western France. On 1 January 2016, the former commune of Hyenville was merged into Quettreville-sur-Sienne. On 1 January 2019, the former communes of Contrières, Guéhébert, Hérenguerville and Trelly were merged into Quettreville-sur-Sienne. The river Sienne flows through the town.

People
Louis Beuve (1869-1949), poet in the Norman language, was a native of the town.

See also
Communes of the Manche department

References

Quettrevillesursienne